Thingwall Hall is a former stately home situated in the Knotty Ash district of Liverpool, England. It can upon occasion be mistaken for the nearby Thingwall House.

History
According to Stephen Harding's Viking Mersey, Thingwall Hall is on the site of a Thing which, like Thingwall on the Wirral and the Tynwald on the Isle of Man (and Dingwall and Tingwall in Scotland), was one of the local Scandinavian parliaments in the Norse-occupied areas of the British Isles.

A Liverpool merchant Thomas Crowther lived there in 1824 and at this time the hall was known as Summerhill. Thomas Case of the prominent Case family and also Mayor of Liverpool in 1817 lived there for a time. In 1845 the property was purchased from the executors of Thomas Case by Samuel Thompson. It eventually descended through the important Thompson family, to his son and grandson, Samuel Henry Thompson and Henry Yates Thompson before being sold by Annie Thompson to Sir David Radcliffe at the beginning of 1899, who in turn sold the property to a land company in 1903.

Beyond the hall there is a small "village" of housing for the residents, along with a garden centre which provides some employment and activity for many of them.

In most recent years the land was purchased by a housing developer with the intent to construct up to 550 homes upon the site.

See also
Listed buildings in Huyton with Roby

Notes

References

External links 
Picture of Thingwall Hall

History of Liverpool
Country houses in Merseyside
Grade II listed buildings in Liverpool